Dance with Me: Music from the Motion Picture is the soundtrack album released on August 11, 1998 by Sony Music. It includes the songs used on the movie Dance with Me starred by Vanessa L. Williams and Chayanne. The movie and soundtrack were promoted with the song "Refugio de Amor", performed by Williams and Chayanne, which peaked at number 4 in the Billboard Latin Pop Songs chart. The album peaked at number one on the Billboard Top Latin Albums chart for six consecutive weeks.

Track listing

Chart performance

See also
List of number-one Billboard Top Latin Albums from the 1990s
List of number-one Billboard Tropical Albums from the 1990s

References 

Spanish-language soundtracks
1990s film soundtrack albums
Albums produced by Sergio George
1998 soundtrack albums
Tropical music soundtracks